The 1996 Dutch Figure Skating Championships took place between 6 and 7 January 1996 in Zoetermeer. Skaters competed in the disciplines of men's singles, ladies' singles, and pair skating.

Senior results

Men

Ladies

Pairs

External links
 results

Dutch Figure Skating Championships
Dutch Figure Skating Championships, 1996
1996 in Dutch sport